Maaththoor formerly known as Mathur is a residential area located north of Chennai, a metropolitan city in Tamil Nadu, India. Maaththoor is administered by the Greater Chennai Corporation and belongs to Madhavaram taluk of Chennai district.

Location
Maaththoor is located north of Chennai with Manali in the east and Madhavaram Milk Colony to the south. Other neighbouring areas include Madhavaram, Kosappur and Kodungaiyur.

History
In earlier days Maaththoor is a rural area comprising the villages Periyamaaththoor and Chinnamaaththoor. In the early 1990s the Tamil Nadu Housing Board and the Madras Metropolitan Development Authority planned and developed a township in the village of Periyamaaththoor and named as Maaththoor MMDA. In October 2011, the erstwhile Maaththoor village panchayat is merged with Greater Chennai Corporation and it came under the jurisdiction of Greater Chennai Corporation. Though Maaththoor is annexed with Greater Chennai Corporation in 24 October 2011 it remained as a part of Madhavaram taluk in Thiruvallur district till 15 August 2018 which was later added into Chennai district officially with other areas fall under the Greater Chennai Corporation limits. On 11 June 2020, the Government of Tamil Nadu renamed Mathur as Maaththoor along with other neighbourhoods and towns of Tamil Nadu as per the pronunciation in Tamil language.

Demographics

According to 2011 census, Maaththoor had a population of 27,674 with 14,081 males and 13,593 females. A total of 2,980 were under the age of six, constituting 1,607 males and 1,373 females. Scheduled Castes and Scheduled Tribes accounted for 16.57% and .13% of the population, respectively. The average literacy of the town was 80.41%, compared to the national average of 72.99%. The town had a total of 6886 households. There were a total of 10,160 workers, comprising 64 cultivators, 97 main agricultural labourers, 79 in house hold industries, 7,871 other workers, 2,049 marginal workers, 24 marginal cultivators, 99 marginal agricultural labourers, 77 marginal workers in household industries and 1,849 other marginal workers. There were a total of 17,514 non workers. As per the religious census of 2011, Maaththoor had 84.40% Hindus, 6.05% Muslims, 8.72% Christians, 0.17% Sikhs, 0.02% Buddhists, 0.09% Jains, 0.05% following other religions and 0.39% following no religion or did not indicate any religious preference.

See also
 Maaththoor aeri
 Madhavaram Botanical Garden

References

External links
Greater Chennai Corporation official website
Chennai District official website
CMDA official website
CDMA map of Maaththoor

Neighbourhoods in Chennai